Richard Fenwick may refer to:

 Richard Fenwick (footballer), English footballer
 Richard Fenwick (bishop) (born 1943), Anglican bishop